The Camino Real in New Mexico was the northern part of a historic roadway known as the Camino Real de Tierra Adentro that from 1598 ran from Mexico City northward through central and northern Mexico and the Trans-Pecos part of what is now Texas to San Juan Pueblo (Ohkay Owingeh) in Santa Fe de Nuevo Mexico, now the state of New Mexico.

Road sections on the National Register of Historic Places 
Fourteen sections of the Camino Real (El Camino Real) in New Mexico were listed on the National Register of Historic Places in 2011, 2013, 2014, and 2018.

Some or all of them are parts of the Camino Real de Tierra Adentro, which was an historic  trade route between Mexico City and San Juan Pueblo, from 1598 to 1882. It was the northernmost of the four major "royal roads" that linked Mexico City to its major tributaries during and after the Spanish colonial era.

The listings are by county from the south to north:

Doña Ana County (this county is on the border with Mexico)
11000172 Camino Real–Rincon Arroyo–Perrillo Section, NRHP-listed April 8, 2011, Rincon Rincon Arroyo Perrillo
11000166 Camino Real–San Diego North South Section, NRHP-listed April 8, 2011, Radium Springs 
11000165 Camino Real–San Diego South, NRHP-listed April 8, 2011, Rincon
Sierra County (adjacent, to north of Doña Ana County)
11000171 Camino Real–Point of Rocks Section, NRHP-listed April 8, 2011, northeast of Rincon, in the vicinity of the Point of Rocks, Sierra County
11000163 Camino Real–Yost Draw Section, south of Aleman, NRHP-listed April 8, 2011, north northeast of Point of Rocks, southeast of Aleman in Sierra County Yost Draw
11000167 Camino Real–Jornada Lakes Section, north of Aleman but south of Engle, NRHP-listed April 8, 2011, in Sierra County Jornada Lakes 

Socorro County (adjacent, to north of Sierra County)
11000173 Camino Real–Qualacu Pueblo, NRHP-listed April 8, 2011, east of the vicinity of San Antonio Qualacu Pueblo
11000164 Camino Real–San Pascual Pueblo, NRHP-listed April 8, 2011, southeast of the vicinity of San Antonio, New Mexico San Pascual Pueblo
14000898 El Camino Real de Tierra Adentro–Arroyo Alamillo North Section, NRHP-listed November 5, 2014, vicinity of San Acacia

Santa Fe County (further to the north)
11000169 Camino Real–Alamitos Section, NRHP-listed April 8, 2011, Santa Domingo Pueblo.
11000168 Camino Real–La Bajada Mesa Section, Santa Fe, NRHP-listed April 8, 2011, La Bajada Mesa
11000170 Camino Real–Canon de las Bocas Section, NRHP-listed April 8, 2011,Santa Fe  Canon de las Bocas
13000774 El Rancho de las Golondrinas Section–El Camino Real de Tierra Adentro, Santa Fe
13000775 La Cieneguilla South Section–El Camino Real de Tierra Adento, September 25, 2013, La Cienega
100002204 El Camino Real de Tierra Adentro–La Bajada North Section, listed March 19, 2018, La Cienega	
100002205 El Camino Real de Tierra Adentro–La Bajada South Section, listed March 19, 2018, La Cienega

Camino Real–Jornada Lakes Section, near Engle, dates from 1598.  It was listed on the National Register of Historic Places in 2011.  It has also been denoted LA 71818.

References

External links
El Camino Real north of Albuquerque, photo at National Archives
El Camino Real in downtown Bernalillo, photo at National Archives

Buildings and structures completed in 1598
Historic American Engineering Record in New Mexico
National Register of Historic Places in Sierra County, New Mexico
Roads in New Mexico